Sudbury is a village and civil parish in Derbyshire, England, located about  south of Ashbourne. It is part of the Derbyshire Dales district. The population as recorded at the 2001 Census was 976, increasing to 1,010 at the 2011 Census. The £0.5m A50 bypass opened in 1972.  The parish includes the hamlets of Aston, Aston Heath, Dalebrook and Oaks Green.

Sudbury Hall and HM Prison Sudbury are located here.

History
Sudbury was mentioned in the Domesday book as belonging to Henry de Ferrers and was worth twenty shillings.

Sudbury previously had its own railway station that is now closed.

Famous residents
 Edward Harcourt, Archbishop of York, was born here
 William Harcourt founder of the British Association for the Advancement of Science was born here in 1789.
 George John Warren Vernon, M.P. and Dante enthusiast was born here in 1803

See also
Listed buildings in Sudbury, Derbyshire

References

External links

Villages in Derbyshire
Civil parishes in Derbyshire
World War II prisoner of war camps in England
Derbyshire Dales